Filippo di Colloredo-Mels (29 November 1779 in Udine – 9 October 1864 in Recanati) was a leader of the Sovereign Military Order of Malta.

From the Friulian noble family of the counts of Colloredo-Mels, his decision to join the Order was a sudden one – he was inscribed in it on 28 November 1779, when he was less than a year old. He made his adult profession to join it on 8 May 1840 and succeeded Carlo Candida as its lieutenant general in 1834, holding the post until his death, when he was succeeded by Alessandro Borgia.

Sources
 Francesco Giuseppe Terrinoni Memorie storiche della resa di Malta ai francesi nel 1798, tip. delle Belle Arti, Roma, 1867.

1778 births
1864 deaths
Lieutenants of the Sovereign Military Order of Malta